St Budeaux Victoria Road railway station is a suburban station in St Budeaux, Plymouth, Devon, England. The station is managed and served by Great Western Railway.

History
The station was close to the road to the Saltash ferry across the River Tamar.

A connection to the Great Western Railway was installed east of the station on 21 March 1941 to offer the two companies alternative routes between Plymouth and St Budeaux should either line be closed due to bombing during World War II. Weston Mill Halt had been the first stop on the old L&SWR line east to Plymouth Friary between 1906 and 1921.

Facilities
There is a single platform, on the left of trains arriving from Plymouth. The only facilities are a small waiting shelter, and timetable posters at the top of the path leading down to the station. There are no ticket buying facilities, so passengers have to buy a ticket in advance or from the guard on the train.

Services

Signalling 
Trains heading towards Bere Alston must collect the branch train staff from a secure cabinet on the platform before proceeding, as the line is operated on the one train working system with only a single unit allowed on the branch at a time.  Conversely, the staff has to be returned to the cabinet by the driver on the return journey before the unit can leave the branch and return to Plymouth. This operation was shown in an episode of the Channel 5 documentary series "The Railway - First Great Western" in October 2013.

Community railway
The Tamar Valley Line is designated as a community railway and is supported by marketing provided by the Devon and Cornwall Rail Partnership. Two pubs on the banks of the River Tamar at St Budeaux are part of the Tamar Valley Line rail ale trail, which is designed to promote the use of the line.  The line is part of the Dartmoor Sunday Rover network of integrated bus and rail routes.

See also
Exeter to Plymouth railway of the LSWR

References

Further reading

Railway stations in Plymouth, Devon
Former Plymouth, Devonport and South Western Junction Railway stations
Railway stations in Great Britain opened in 1890
Railway stations served by Great Western Railway
DfT Category F2 stations